Ashoknath N. Banerji (7 October 1929 – 2006) was an Indian politician who was the Governor of Karnataka, India from 16 April 1983 to 25 February 1988. Banerji was a bureaucrat from the Indian Administrative Service. Banerji died in 2006.

See also
 List of Governors of Karnataka

References

1929 births
2006 deaths
Governors of Karnataka